James Talbertt Housewright (November 23, 1921 – September 19, 1977) was an American labor union leader.

Born in Wesco, Missouri, Housewright grew up in Indiana.  He joined the Retail Clerks International Union in 1947, and soon became secretary-treasurer of its Local 725, based in Indianapolis.  He became a full-time representative of the union in 1953, a division director the following year, then director of organization, and executive assistant to the president.  In 1968, he was elected as the union's president, one of the youngest leaders of a major labor union.  Under his leadership, the union's membership doubled.

Housewright also became a vice-president of the AFL-CIO.  In this role, he led the formation of a new Food and Beverage Trades Department, to improve working relationships between the various unions in the industry.  He became the first president of the new department, and in that role, began negotiating a merger between his union, the Retail, Wholesale and Department Store Union, and the Amalgamated Meat Cutters and Butcher Workmen of North America.  However, he died in 1977, before any merger could be agreed.

References

1921 births
1977 deaths
American trade union leaders
People from Crawford County, Missouri
Trade unionists from Missouri